Neoregelia rubrifolia is a species of flowering plant in the genus Neoregelia. This species is endemic to Brazil.

Cultivars
 Neoregelia 'Rosanna'
 Neoregelia 'Sun Devil'

References

BSI Cultivar Registry Retrieved 11 October 2009

rubrifolia
Flora of Brazil